Joseph E. Gillis (3 August 1911 – 18 November 1993) was a British-Israeli mathematician and one of the founders of the Faculty of Mathematics at the Weizmann Institute of Science, where he served as a Professor of Applied Mathematics. He made notable contributions to fractal sets, fluid dynamics, random walks, and pioneered the combinatorial theory of special functions of mathematical physics.

Career 
Gillis was born on 3 August 1911 in Sunderland, in the north east of England. He studied at Trinity College, Cambridge, completing his doctoral thesis on "Some Geometrical Properties of Linearly Measurable Plane Sets of Points" under A.S. Besicovitch in 1935. During World War II he worked in Bletchley Park as a cryptographer.  He taught maths at Queen's University Belfast between 1937 and 1947.

In 1948 he immigrated to Israel and joined the Weizmann Institute of Science (then the Ziv Institute), where he, along with others, founded the Department of Applied Mathematics. He also served as the Academic Secretary. During the Academic Year 1954-1955 he visited the Institute for Advanced Study as part of the Electronic Computer Project headed by John von Neumann. He was very active in advancing mathematics education, and chaired the department of Science Teaching at the Weizmann Institute. He also started the Israel Mathematics Olympiad and coached the Israeli team for many years, as well as edited mathematics periodicals for high school students and amateurs.

Personal life 
He was married to Olga Kirsch and had two daughters. He died on 18 November 1993.

References

Israeli mathematicians
1911 births
1993 deaths
Academic staff of Weizmann Institute of Science
20th-century  English mathematicians
People from Sunderland
Alumni of Trinity College, Cambridge
Academics of Queen's University Belfast
British emigrants to Israel
Bletchley Park people
20th-century Israeli mathematicians